A caterpillar is the larval form of some insects.

Caterpillar, The Caterpillar or Caterpillars may also refer to:

Arts and entertainment

Literature
 Caterpillar (Alice's Adventures in Wonderland), a character in the book by Lewis Carroll
The Caterpillar (magazine), children's poetry magazine associated with The Moth magazine

Television
 "Caterpillars", an episode of the television series Teletubbies
 "The Caterpillar", an episode of the television series Night Gallery

Films
 Caterpillar (1988 film), a 1988 Japanese short experimental film
 Caterpillar (2010 film), a 2010 Japanese drama film

Music
 Caterpillar (Elisa album), 2007
 Caterpillar (Mina album), 1991
 Caterpillar, a 2003 album by The Tokey Tones
 "The Caterpillar" (song), a 1984 song by The Cure
 Caterpillar (song), a 2018 song by Royce da 5'9"

Other entertainment
 Caterpillar (ride), an amusement ride
 Caterpillar, a clone of the Centipede arcade game

Brands and organizations
 Caterpillar Club, an association of those who have parachuted from a disabled airplane 
 Caterpillar Inc., a construction equipment manufacturing corporation
 Caterpillar (boot brand), boots made under a license from Caterpillar Inc.

Mechanical devices
 Caterpillar drive or magnetohydrodynamic drive, a method for propelling vehicles using only electric and magnetic fields with no moving parts
 Caterpillar track or continuous track, a system of vehicle propulsion

Other uses
 Caterpillar tree, a mathematical tree in which all leaves are connected to a central path
 Plumeria alba or Caterpillar tree, a shrub
 Caterpillar ridge, important in several World War I battles, especially the Battle of Hill 60 (Western Front)